Ealing West was a constituency, 1945 to 1950 containing parts of the Municipal Borough of Ealing in Middlesex, in west north-west London. It returned one member (MP) to the House of Commons of the UK Parliament using the first past the post system.

History
The constituency was created for the 1945 general election and abolished for the 1950 general election. From that date, the Municipal Borough of Ealing was represented by the new Ealing North and Ealing South; and by the Southall constituency which included two wards of the borough of Ealing until that constituency's abolition in February 1974.

Boundaries 

The Municipal Borough of Ealing wards of: Greenford North, Greenford South, Hanwell North, Hanwell South, and Northolt.

Members of Parliament

Election results

Elections in the 1940s

References

Parliamentary constituencies in London (historic)
Constituencies of the Parliament of the United Kingdom established in 1945
Constituencies of the Parliament of the United Kingdom disestablished in 1950
Politics of the London Borough of Ealing